Edward Chapman may refer to:
Edward Chapman (British Army officer) (1840–1926)
Edward Chapman (actor) (1901–1977), British comic actor, best remembered for his work with Norman Wisdom
Edward Chapman (politician) (1839–1906), British academic and Conservative politician
Edward Chapman (publisher) (1804–1880), British publisher and co-founder of Chapman & Hall
Edward Thomas Chapman (1920–2002), Welsh World War II Corporal
Ed Chapman (artist) (born 1971), British artist, best known for mosaic portraits
Ed Chapman (baseball) (1905–2000), American major league player
Eddie Chapman (1914–1997), British double agent code name Zig-Zag during World War II
Eddie Chapman (footballer) (1923–2002), West Ham United player and club secretary
Edward Chapman, rector and founder of Bishop's College School (1836)

See also
Ted Chapman (1934–2005), Australian politician
Edwards and Chapman Building, a heritage-listed building in Brisbane, Queensland, Australia